The Dungeness River Bridge is the centerpiece of Railroad Bridge Park near the town of Sequim, Washington. It crosses the Dungeness River. The bridge was first constructed by the Seattle, Port Angeles, and Western Railway, a subsidiary of the Chicago, Milwaukee, St. Paul and Pacific Railroad (also known as the Milwaukee Road) in 1916. Because of the ready availability of timber, the bridge was built of wood. This first bridge was replaced in 1930. The new bridge was also built of timber, and like its predecessor, is a through Howe truss 156 feet long and 22 feet high. Two wooden trestles are on the east and west approaches.

After the Milwaukee Road's bankruptcy, the bridge was left abandoned. In 1992, volunteers began to work on the bridge and replace planking and created a bike trail. In 1995, the property surrounding the bridge was purchased by the Washington State Audubon Society, which then created the Dungeness River Center and a park, called Railroad Bridge Park. The bike path through the park and over the bridge is connected to the Olympic Discovery Trail, a rails-to-trails initiative.

The bridge was listed in the National Register of Historic Places due to its being one of the last timber Howe through-truss railroad bridges still remaining in Washington.

In February 2015, due to high winds and rainfall, the Bridge's center collapsed. The repaired and improved bridge was reopened in March 2016.

References
Notes

Bibliography
Soderberg, Lisa. Dungeness River Bridge. OAHP Inventory, Office of Archaeology and Historic Preservation, Olympia Washington. 1979. On file at the National Park Service, Washington, DC.
Soderberg, Lisa. . National Register of Historic Places Inventory - Nomination Form. On file at the National Park Service, Washington DC.

External links

 Dungeness River Center

Chicago, Milwaukee, St. Paul and Pacific Railroad
Railroad bridges on the National Register of Historic Places in Washington (state)
Bridges completed in 1930
Bridges in Clallam County, Washington
Railroad bridges in Washington (state)
National Register of Historic Places in Clallam County, Washington
Howe truss bridges in the United States
Wooden bridges in the United States